United Arab Emirates will participate in the 2011 Asian Winter Games in Almaty and Astana, Kazakhstan  from January 30, 2011 to February 6, 2011.

Ice hockey

Men
The team is in the premier division for these games.

Premier Division

Matches

References

Nations at the 2011 Asian Winter Games
Asian Winter Games
United Arab Emirates at the Asian Games
United Arab Emirates at the Asian Winter Games